The Employees' Provident Fund Organisation (EPFO) is one of the two in statutory social security bodies under the Government of India's Ministry of Labour and Employment and is responsible for regulation and management of provident funds in India, the other being Employees' State Insurance. The EPFO administers the mandatory provident fund, a basic pension scheme and a disability/death insurance scheme. It also manages social security agreements with other countries. International workers are covered under EPFO plans in countries where bilateral agreements have been signed. As of May 2021, 19 such agreements are in place. The EPFO's top decision-making body is the Central Board of Trustees (CBT), a statutory body established by the Employees' Provident Fund and Miscellaneous Provisions (EPF&MP) Act, 1952. As of 2018, more than 11 lakh crore (US$157.8 billion) are under EPFO management.

On 1 October 2014 the Government of India launched a Universal Account Number for employees covered by EPFO to enable Provident Fund number portability.

Origins

The first Provident Fund Act, passed in 1925 for regulating the provident funds of some private concerns, was limited in scope. In 1929, the Royal Commission on Labour stressed the need for creating provident funds for industrial workers. In the Indian Labour Conference held in 1948, it was generally agreed that the introduction of a statutory provident fund for industrial workers should be undertaken. The Coal Mines Provident Fund Scheme was launched in 1948. The success of this fund led to demand for its expansion to other industries.

The Constitution of India enacted in 1950 a non-justiciable directive that the State shall, within the limits of its economic capacity, make effective provisions for securing the right to work, to education and to public assistance in cases of unemployment, old-age, sickness & disablement and undeserved want. Accordingly, the last months of 1951 witnessed the promulgation of the Employees' Provident Funds Ordinance, which came into effect on 15 November 1951. It was replaced by the Employees' Provident Funds Act, which extended to the whole of India except Jammu & Kashmir. The Employees' Provident Funds Scheme, framed under section 5 of the Act, was introduced in stages and came into force in its entirety by 1 November 1952. The cement, cigarette, electric, mechanical and general engineering products, iron, steel, paper, and textile industries were affected by the Act. The Acts and Schemes framed under it are administered by the Central Board of Trustees, which consists of representatives of Central and State governments, employers, and employees. The Board administers a contributory provident fund, pension scheme and an insurance scheme for the workforce engaged in the organized sector in India. The board is chaired by the Union Labour Minister of India.

Presently, the following three schemes are in operation under the Act:
  Employees' Provident Fund Scheme, 1952
  Employees' Deposit Linked Insurance Scheme, 1976
  Employees' Pension Scheme, 1995 (replacing the Employees' Family Pension Scheme, 1971)

Recent Developments 
In March 2022, the EPFO lowered the interest rate on employee provident funds to 8.10% for 2021-22,The EPFO lowered the interest rate of 8.10% for the fiscal year of 2021-22.

On 30 August 2022, EPFO proposed to remove the restrictions on the wage ceiling and headcount to allow all formal workers and self-employed to enrol in its retirement saving schemes.

Structure

The EPFO has the role of being the enforcement agency to oversee the implementation of the EPF&MP Act and as a service provider for the covered beneficiaries throughout the country. The Act is administered by the Central Board of Trustees (informally, the CBT), which consists of a Chairman, a Vice-Chairman, 5 Central Government representatives, 15 State Government representatives, 10 Employees' representatives, 10 Employers' representatives with Central PF Commissioner and the Member Secretary to the Board. The CBT's Executive Committee is chosen from CBT members to assist the Central Board in the discharge of its functions related to administrative matters.

The officials of the organisation in the Cadre of Commissioners are appointed by the Central Board under Section 5D for the efficient administration of the Act and Schemes. To this end, the commissioners of the organisation are vested with vast powers under the statute conferring quasi-judicial authority for the assessment of financial liability on the employer, search and seizure of records, levy of damages, attachment and auction of a defaulter's property, prosecution and arrest and detention of defaulters in civil prison etc.

Administratively, the organisation is divided into zones that are headed by an Additional Central Provident Fund Commissioner. At present, there are ten Zones across India. The states have one or more Regional Offices headed by Regional Provident Fund Commissioners (RPFC) (Grade I); the Regional Offices are sub-divided into Sub-Regions headed by Regional Provident Fund Commissioners (Grade II). To assist them are Assistant Provident Fund Commissioners (APFCs) looking after the enforcement of the Act and Schemes. Many district offices have an APFC to implement the scheme and attend to grievances.

The total manpower of the EPFO is at present more than 20,000 including all levels. The 815 Commissioners are recruited directly, competitively, through the Union Public Service Commission of India as well as through promotion from lower ranks. Subordinate Officers (Enforcement Officers/Accounts Officers) are also recruited directly in addition to promotion from the staff cadre of social security assistants.

Universal Account Number
The Universal Account Number (UAN) is a 12-digit number allotted to employees who contribute to an EPF. A UAN is generated for each PF member by the EPFO. The UAN acts as an umbrella for the multiple Member IDs allotted to an individual by different establishments and remains the same throughout the lifetime of an employee. It does not change between jobs. The idea is to link multiple Member Identification Numbers (Member IDs) allotted to a single member under a single UAN. This will help the member to view details of all the Member Identification Numbers (Member ID) linked to it.

The major benefit of the UAN is convenience when tagging multiple Member IDs of a single employee. The UAN helps with transfer and withdrawals of PF claims, online or offline. Along with these services like the Online Pass-Book, SMS services on each deposit of contribution and online KYC updates can be provided based on the UAN, which enables transfer of the balance from one EPF to another.

A new (2018) UAN portal allows members to check EPF balances and UAN status, download a UAN EPF passbook, view a provident fund claim, etc.

Members who are unable to withdraw PF for any reason can withdraw without the consent of the employer. They can submit FORM 19 for EPF (Employees' Provident Fund) and FORM 10C for EPS (Employees' Pension Scheme) to the EPFO office in which their EPF account is maintained.

A UAN provided by EPFO is mainly used to track PF balance and PF claim status.

Employees' Pension Scheme 
The Employees' Pension Scheme (EPS) has been controlled by the EPFO since 1995. The main advantage of this scheme is to provide social security to PF members. Under this scheme, employees working in the organized sector can gain pension benefit after reaching age 58. This EPS applies to new and existing members.

The Scheme has been framed by the Central Government in accordance with the powers conferred by section 6A of the Employees’ Provident Funds and Miscellaneous Provisions (EPF and MP) Act, 1952. The EPS-95 came into force on 19.11.1995. Review and revision of schemes is an ongoing process. The provisions of the EPS-95 are reviewed from time to time based on the recommendations of the Expert Committee and the High Empowered Monitoring Committee as well as taking into account the actuarial evaluation of the Employees' Pension Fund. Some of the important amendments made in EPS-95 are:
 Increase in wage ceiling from ₹6,500 to ₹15,000 per month from 01 Sept 2014.
 Provision of a minimum pension of ₹1000 per month to the pensioners under EPS, 1995 from 01.09.2014 by providing additional budgetary support wherever the pension was falling short of ₹1000 as per pre-defined formula for calculation of pension.
 Restoration of normal pension after completion of fifteen years from the date of such commutation, in respect of those members who availed the benefit of commutation of pension under the erstwhile paragraph 12A of the EPS, 1995, on or before 25.09.2008 vide notification G.S.R.132(E) dated 20.02.2020.

Exemption for International Workers 
International Workers are exempted if the worker holds passport of the Country with which India has signed a Social Security Agreement and/or member is contributing to a Social Security Program of the Country with whom India has signed a Social Security Agreement.

Currently, India has entered into Social Security Agreement with following countries:

Landmark Judgements

The Regional Provident Fund Commissioner (II) West Bengal vs Vivekananda Vidamandir And Others 
Honourable Supreme Court of India vide above mentioned Case stated that any of the allowances universally, necessarily and ordinarily paid to all across the board, such emoluments are basic wages and the employer should consider the same while deducting and remitting the EPF Dues. Hence, any allowance which is paid to every employee categorically will be covered under the purview of EPF.

Civicon Engineering Contracting India Pvt. Ltd. vs Central Board of Trustees & Ors 
Honourable Delhi High Court stated that Central Provident Fund Commissioner (‘CPFC’) shall pass immediate practice directions in respect of uploading of all orders which are passed by the Regional Provident Fund Commissioners (RPFCs), Assistant Provident Fund Commissioners (APFC), Central Government Industrial Tribunal (CGIT) and any other officials/authorities who adjudicate disputes.

Hence, all orders must be made available under section 7A, 7B, 7Q and 14B on the Provident Fund's Website https://eproceedings.epfindia.gov.in by the Department.

References

Age pension systems
Retirement in India
Labour relations in India
Public pension funds
Business organisations based in India
Government agencies of India
Social security in India